Genaro Fessia (born July 22, 1981 in Córdoba) is an Argentine rugby union footballer. He plays flank. Fessia's debut match for his country was in 2005 when he played against Canada. He was also selected to represent Argentina for the incoming June 2010 tours against France and Scotland. Fessia has played most of his rugby for Cordoba Athletic Club.  But in 2007 he spent a year playing with Sale Sharks.

References

 Player Stats from Scrum.com

External links
 Iberiam Rugby Player Profile

1981 births
Living people
Sportspeople from Córdoba, Argentina
Argentine rugby union players
Argentina international rugby union players
Pampas XV players
Sale Sharks players
Wasps RFC players
Rugby union number eights